The city of Geelong, Australia, has a number of schools.

History
The first schools in Geelong were established when the town was settled from the 1850s. Many of these schools remain open today, now joined by a number of new schools opened from the 1950s when the population of Geelong grew after World War II.

HRH Charles, Prince of Wales, spent two terms at the Timbertop campus of Geelong Grammar School in 1966.

The late 1980s and 1990s saw changes to the school system, with new secondary colleges such as Catholic Regional College and Western Heights Secondary College were created from smaller secondary schools. It was also at this time that a number of technical schools were closed, and primary schools were closed by the Kennett State Government.

Tertiary education began with the Gordon Institute of Technology in 1888. Reform of the university sector resulted in the creation of Deakin University in the 1970s.

Today over 40,000 primary and secondary students are enrolled in schools in Geelong, with another 27,000 students a year enrolled in tertiary and further education courses. Western Heights Secondary College will be split from a three-campus school in western Geelong to a single-campus school in Vines Road in the coming years.

Northern Bay P–12 College was formed in 2011 as a result of a merger of nine schools into one multi-campus College.
This process of regeneration of the Corio and Norlane government schools began in 2006 and was driven by the nine school communities to ensure young people and their families in the northern suburbs of Geelong had access to high-quality education in world-class facilities.

Primary education

Secondary education

Public

Private

Defunct and merged
 Catholic Regional College Geelong (into St Ignatius College)
 Chanel College (Geelong) (closed)
 North Geelong Primary School (closed)
 Goold College (into Catholic Regional College)
 Geelong East Technical School (had changed name to) James Harrison Secondary College (merged into Newcomb Secondary College)
 Morongo Girls' College (closed)
 St Mary's Technical School (into Catholic Regional College)
 The Hermitage (into Geelong Grammar School)
 Western Heights Secondary College (Barton Campus) (into Western Heights Secondary College Minerva Campus)
 Flinders Peak Secondary College (into Northern Bay College)
 Rosewall Primary School (into Northern Bay College)
 Norlane High School (into Northern Bay College)
 Corio South Primary School (into Northern Bay College)
 Corio Primary School (into Northern Bay College)
 Corio Bay Senior College (formerly Corio Technical School) (into Northern Bay College)
 North Shore Primary School (into Northern Bay College)
 Norlane West Primary School (into Northern Bay College)
 Corio West Primary School (into Northern Bay College in 2011)

Tertiary Education
 Diversitat Institute of Education and Training Australia – Geelong Campus
 Deakin University – Geelong and Waurn Ponds Campuses
 Gordon Institute of TAFE
 Victorian Fitness Academy – Geelong Campus
 Marcus Oldham Farm Management College
 Reformed Theological College
 Diversitat Training

References

External links
 Services In Geelong – Schools

Geelong
Geelong

Geelong-related lists